This is a list of members of the Parliament of Singapore who were elected as a member of a opposition party since 1965. In Singapore, the People's Action Party has been the governing party since 1959.

List

(b) = by-election

References

Elections in Singapore
Lists of political office-holders in Singapore
Members of the Parliament of Singapore
Parliament of Singapore
Singapore politics-related lists